The Doherty amplifier is a modified class B radio frequency amplifier invented by William H. Doherty of Bell Telephone Laboratories Inc in 1936. Whereas conventional class B amplifiers can clip on high input-signal levels, the Doherty power amplifier can accommodate signals with high peak-to-average power ratios by using two amplifier circuits within the one overall amplifier to accommodate the different signal levels.  In this way, the amplifier achieves a high level of linearity while retaining good power efficiency.

In Doherty's day, within the Western Electric product line, the eponymous electronic device was operated as a linear amplifier with a driver which was modulated. In the 50,000-watt implementation, the driver was a complete 5,000-watt transmitter which could, if necessary, be operated independently of the Doherty amplifier and the Doherty amplifier was used to raise the 5,000-watt level to the required 50,000-watt level.

The amplifier was usually configured as a grounded-cathode, carrier–peak amplifier using two vacuum tubes in parallel connection, one as a class B carrier tube and the other as a class B peak tube (power transistors in modern implementations). The tubes' source (driver) and load (antenna) were split and combined through +90 and −90 degree phase shifting networks. Alternate configurations included a grounded-grid carrier tube and a grounded-cathode peak tube whereby the driver power was effectively passed-through the carrier tube and was added to the resulting output power, but this benefit was more appropriate for the earlier and less efficient triode implementations rather than the later and more efficient tetrode implementations.

Successor broadcast developments
As successor to Western Electric Company Inc for radio broadcast transmitters, the Doherty concept was considerably refined by Continental Electronics Manufacturing Company of Dallas, Texas.

Early Continental Electronics designs, by James O. Weldon and others, retained most of the characteristics of Doherty's amplifier but added medium-level screen-grid modulation of the driver (317B, et al.).

A further refinement of Doherty's amplifier was the high-level screen-grid modulation scheme invented by Joseph B. Sainton (317C, et al.).

Sainton's 317C series consisted of a class C carrier tube in parallel connection with a class C peak tube. As in Doherty's amplifier, the tubes' source (driver) and load (antenna) were split and combined through +90 and −90 degree phase-shifting networks. The unmodulated radio frequency carrier was applied to the control grids of both tubes with the same control grid bias points. Carrier modulation was applied to the screen grids of both tubes, but the screen grid bias points of the carrier and peak tubes were different and were established such that the peak tube was cut off when modulation was absent, and the amplifier was producing rated unmodulated carrier power, and both tubes were conducting, and each tube was contributing twice the rated carrier power during 100% modulation as four times the rated carrier power was required to achieve 100% modulation. As both tubes were operated in class C, a significant improvement in efficiency was thereby achieved in the final stage.

In addition, as the tetrode carrier and peak tubes required very little drive power, a significant improvement in efficiency within the driver was achieved as well. The commercial version of the Sainton amplifier employed a cathode-follower modulator, not the push-pull modulator disclosed in the patent, and the entire 50,000-watt transmitter was implemented using only nine total tubes of four tube types, all of these being general-purpose tubes, a remarkable achievement, given that the 317C's most significant competitor, RCA's BTA-50G, was implemented using thirty-two total tubes of nine tube types, nearly one-half of these being special-purpose, being employed only in the BTA-50G.

Nearly 300 CE 317C transmitters were installed in North America alone, easily outdistancing all competitors combined, until the development of successor high-power transistorized designs.

Doherty amplifiers are widely used in modern digital broadcast transmitters for television and radio.  The digital modulation used has a high peak-to-average power ratio (PAPR).

Non-broadcast developments
Modern communication systems have seen the sudden resurrection of Doherty amplifiers in 4G and pre-5G massive Multiple-Input Multiple-Output (mMIMO) based base stations. The fact that modern communication systems use complex signal modulation schemes like OFDM (Orthogonal Frequency Division Multiplexing) with a high peak-to-average power ratio (PAPR), the probability of amplifier operating at its peak power with its maximum efficiency is very low. The property to the Doherty amplifier exhibiting multiple efficiency peaks at various lower power levels makes it an attractive option to boost the average efficiency of modern-day transmitters. The Doherty amplifier can accomplish by using a technique called "Dynamic Load Modulation" wherein the load is seen by the main amplifier changes as a function of power level in order to boost the efficiency at lower power levels.

Footnotes

References

Further reading
 − US Patent
 

Electronic amplifiers
Valve amplifiers